Severna Park (born 1958), real name Suzanne Feldman, is an American science fiction author and winner of the Nebula Award for Best Short Story (The Cure For Everything, 2001).

Her first novel, Speaking Dreams from 1992, was a Lambda Literary Award nominee. She was long-listed for James Tiptree Jr. Award in 1994 (Amazons) and short-listed in 1998 (Hand of Prophecy) and 2000 (The Annunciate).

She now writes mainstream fiction. Employed as a teacher, she lives with her partner of twenty-five years in Maryland.

Bibliography

Novels 
 Speaking Dreams
 Speaking Dreams (1992)
 Hand of Prophecy (1998)
 The Annunciate (1999)

Collections 
 The Cure for Everything (2013)

Short fiction 
 Amazons (1993)
 Tiger, Tiger (1998)
 Harbingers (1999)
 The Breadfruit Empire (1999)
 The Golem (2000)
 The Cure for Everything (2000)
 The Peaceable Kingdom (2000)
 Call for Submissions (2003)
 The Island of Varos (2003)
 The Three Unknowns (2004)
 Secret Histories (2013)
 The Crime Museum (2013)

Essay 
 Read This (NYRSF, September 1998) (1998)

References

External links

20th-century American novelists
American science fiction writers
American women short story writers
American women novelists
American lesbian writers
1958 births
Living people
Nebula Award winners
American LGBT novelists
Women science fiction and fantasy writers
20th-century American women writers
20th-century American short story writers
21st-century American women writers